The Indian cricket team toured Zimbabwe from 28 May to 7 July 2001 and played two Test matches against Zimbabwe, with each team winning one game match. This would be Zimbabwe's only Test victory over a side other than Bangladesh until they beat Pakistan in the second Test in 2013.

India and Zimbabwe also participated in a triangular One Day International (ODI) competition with West Indies, with the latter eventually winning the competition.

Tour matches

First-class: Zimbabwe A v Indians

First-class: CFX Academy v Indians

List A: Zimbabwe A v Indians

Test matches

1st Test

2nd Test

Coca-Cola Cup

The Coca-Cola Cup was a One Day International (ODI) tournament that followed the Test series. West Indies were the third team that competed in addition to Zimbabwe and India. After six games between the three sides in the round-robin group stage, West Indies and India qualified for the final. West Indies defeated India by 16 runs in the final.

References

External links
 Tour home at ESPN Cricinfo

2001 in Indian cricket
2001 in Zimbabwean cricket
2001
International cricket competitions in 2001
Zimbabwean cricket seasons from 2000–01